The 2019 Under-20 Provincial Championship was the 2019 edition of the Under-20 Provincial Championship, an annual national Under-20 rugby union competition held in South Africa, and was contested from 13 July to 30 August 2019.

Competition rules and information

There were nine participating teams in the 2019 Under-20 Provincial Championship. The teams were divided into three sections, with each team playing the other two teams in their section twice during the regular season, once at home and once away. Teams received four points for a win and two points for a draw. Bonus points were awarded to teams that scored four or more tries in a game, as well as to teams that lost a match by seven points or less. Teams were ranked by log points, then points difference (points scored less points conceded).

The top four teams in the pool stage — the three section winners, plus the runner-up with the best record — qualified for the semi-finals, where the section winner with the best record hosted the best runner-up, and the section winner with the second-best record hosted the section winner with the third-best record. The two semi-final winners played in the final, played as a curtain-raiser for the 2019 Currie Cup First Division final.

Teams

The teams that competed in the 2019 Under-20 Provincial Championship are:

Regular season

North Section

Standings

The final standings in the 2019 Under-20 Provincial Championship North Section were:

Round-by-round

The table below shows each team's progression throughout the season. For each round, each team's cumulative points total is shown with the overall log position in brackets.

Matches

The following matches were played in the 2019 Under-20 Provincial Championship North Section:

Central Section

Standings

The final standings in the 2019 Under-20 Provincial Championship Central Section were:

Round-by-round

The table below shows each team's progression throughout the season. For each round, each team's cumulative points total is shown with the overall log position in brackets.

Matches

The following matches were played in the 2019 Under-20 Provincial Championship Central Section:

Coastal Section

Standings

The final standings in the 2019 Under-20 Provincial Championship Coastal Section were:

Round-by-round

The table below shows each team's progression throughout the season. For each round, each team's cumulative points total is shown with the overall log position in brackets.

Matches

The following matches were played in the 2019 Under-20 Provincial Championship Coastal Section:

Play-offs

The three section winners qualified for the play-offs, ranked by their record in the regular season. They were joined by the runner-up with the best record.

Semi-finals

Final

Honours

The honour roll for the 2019 Under-20 Provincial Championship was:

Referees

The following referees officiated matches in the 2019 Under-20 Provincial Championship:

See also

 2019 Currie Cup Premier Division
 2019 Currie Cup First Division
 2019 Rugby Challenge
 2019 Under-21 Provincial Championship

References

External links
 SARU website

2019 in South African rugby union
2019 rugby union tournaments for clubs
2019